Eduardo Joel Fabio Barraclough Valls (1923 – 6 January 2019) was a Spanish-born academic noted for his connection to police in apartheid South Africa.

Career
Barraclough was born in Madrid in 1923, to a Spanish mother and Yorkshire father who founded Madrid's Chamber of Commerce. He moved to London with his family in the 1930s as a refugee from Francoist Spain. He taught fine art and sculpture at Rugby School, where colleagues considered him "highly entertaining, a most unorthodox and highly gifted" teacher. He established himself during the 1960s and early 1970s as an authority on sculpture, publishing in academic journals and becoming a member of the Royal British Society of Sculptors. In 1974, Barraclough was appointed to a three-year contract as professor of fine arts at the University of the Witwatersrand.  some colleagues there did not think well of his work, and he was transferred to a job at an associated gallery.

In 2000, it was revealed that Barraclough, while outwardly living the life of anti-apartheid activist since the 1970s, had been a paid informant of the South African  state security police. The media was used to promote his image as a "brilliant, liberal artist with apparently impeccable credentials" in order to gain public trust, while he was funneling money from anti-apartheid groups to the police. He died on 6 January 2019.

References

External links
Biography of Fabio Barraclough

1923 births
2019 deaths
Apartheid in South Africa
British expatriates in South Africa
People educated at Rugby School
People from Johannesburg
People from Madrid
Spanish emigrants to the United Kingdom
Spanish people of English descent
Academic staff of the University of the Witwatersrand